The following list shows the recipients for the Country Music Association Award for Single of the Year. It was first handed out at the inaugural 1967 CMA Awards to Jack Greene for his recording of "There Goes My Everything" by Dallas Frazier. While its sister category, Song of the Year recognizes the songwriters, Single of the Year is awarded to the artist. Starting in 1989 and 2016 respectively, the producer and mix engineer of the track also received an award. Rules state the track must have reached the Top 10 of Billboard’s Country Airplay Chart, Billboard’s Hot Country Songs Chart, or Country Aircheck Chart for the first time during the eligibility period.  If the single charted in the Top 10 on the above charts and was released prior to the eligibility period but achieved its highest chart position during the eligibility period, it is eligible

Recipients

Category Facts 

 Alan Jackson, Chris Stapleton, George Jones, Johnny Cash, Lady A, Lee Ann Womack, Little Big Town and Willie Nelson all share the most awards with 2 each. 
 George Strait has the most nominations in this category with 9 nominations; followed by Miranda Lambert and Brad Paisley with 8 each. 
 Charley Pride was the first black artist to be nominated in 1969; Darius Rucker was the second on 2013 followed by Kane Brown in 2021.
 Bobby Gentry was the first woman to be nominated; Jeannie C. Riley was the first woman to win the award.

References

Country Music Association Awards